Hyperbaenus is a genus of South American Orthopterans, sometimes known as 'leaf-folding crickets' in the family Gryllacridinae.  It is the type genus for its tribe Hyperbaenini and the new subfamily Hyperbaeninae.

Species 
The Orthoptera Species File lists:
Hyperbaenus bohlsii Giglio-Tos, 1895
Hyperbaenus brevipennis Caudell, 1918
Hyperbaenus brunneri Karny, 1929
Hyperbaenus camerani Griffini, 1911
Hyperbaenus coccinatus Karny, 1937
Hyperbaenus ebneri Karny, 1932
Hyperbaenus ensifer Brunner von Wattenwyl, 1888 - type species (locality: Pernambuco, Brazil)
Hyperbaenus excisus Karny, 1929
Hyperbaenus festae Griffini, 1896
Hyperbaenus fiebrigi Griffini, 1908
Hyperbaenus griffinii Karny, 1932
Hyperbaenus incisus Karny, 1935
Hyperbaenus juvenis Brunner von Wattenwyl, 1888
Hyperbaenus laminatus Ander, 1934
Hyperbaenus minutipennis Bruner, 1915
Hyperbaenus ommatostemma Karny, 1929
Hyperbaenus sjostedti Griffini, 1911
Hyperbaenus ustulatus Karny, 1929
Hyperbaenus virgo Brunner von Wattenwyl, 1888

References 

Ensifera genera
Gryllacrididae
Orthoptera of South America